Harmonischer Gottes-Dienst is a year-cycle of 72 church cantatas composed and published by Georg Philipp Telemann in 1725–26.

References

Sources
Google cache from a Swedish page
The whole collection from The royal library of Denmark

External links
 
 telemann.uib.no – a Norwegian project to record every 72 cantates in Harmonischer Gottes-Dienst (in Norwegian)
  Der Harmonische Gottesdienst, Texts at 

Sacred vocal music by Georg Philipp Telemann
Church cantatas
German church music